Minh Đức may refer to several places in Vietnam, including:

Minh Đức, Đồ Sơn, a ward of Đồ Sơn District in Haiphong
Minh Đức, Hưng Yên, a ward of Mỹ Hào
Minh Đức, Thủy Nguyên, a township of Thủy Nguyên District in Haiphong
Minh Đức, Hanoi, a commune of Ứng Hòa District
Minh Đức, Thái Nguyên, a commune of Phổ Yên 
Minh Đức, Bình Phước, a commune of Hớn Quản District 
Minh Đức, Bến Tre, a commune of Mỏ Cày Nam District 
Minh Đức, Hải Dương, a commune of Tứ Kỳ District 
Minh Đức, Bắc Giang, a commune of Việt Yên District